A quoad sacra parish is a parish of the Church of Scotland which does not represent a civil parish. That is, it had ecclesiastical functions but no local government functions. Since the Local Government (Scotland) Act 1929, civil parishes have had no local government functions, and are of statistical and historical interest only. Typically a number of quoad sacra parishes can exist within a single civil parish, each maintaining its own parish church. Quoad sacra translates from Latin as "concerning sacred matters". Where a civil and an ecclesiastical parish are coterminous, the area is designated a "parish proper", a parish quoad omnia ("concerning all"), or a parish quoad civilia et sacra ("concerning the civil and the sacred").

The term appears from around 1800 in cities where rapid expansion created a demand for more church seats, without the creation of new civil parishes. Unlike a chapel of ease which served a similar function, a quoad sacra church had no obligation to bury its congregation, and so these churches lack burial grounds.

With the expansion of other rival denominations, especially the United Presbyterian Church and (from the Disruption of 1843) the Free Church of Scotland, the distinction became less and less critical, and by 1900 was used only in legal documents.

Role
The distinction between ecclesiastical and civil parishes was often blurred. Civil parishes had the duty of setting church rates, in addition to their civil roles in the provision of education, sanitation and the poor law.

Legislation
Particular Acts of Parliament which created quoad sacra parishes in Scotland are the New Parishes (Scotland) Act 1844, the United Parishes (Scotland) Act 1868 and the United Parishes (Scotland) Act 1876.

References

 
Local government in Scotland
Administrative divisions of Scotland
Church parishes